Hockering is a village and civil parish in Norfolk, England. At the 2001 census the parish had a population of 628. By 2007, the district estimated that this had risen to 665.

Geography

Education
Hockering Church of England Voluntary Controlled Primary School is a small village school which takes children from Hockering and surrounding villages. An Ofsted inspection in December 2010 rated Hockering Primary School as good overall and as satisfactory or better in all respects. It was scored as outstanding for the effectiveness of care, guidance and support, for effectiveness of promoting learning and well-being, and for the extent to which children feel safe.

Administration
The parish lies in the Elmham and Mattishall division of Norfolk County Council and, between 2009 and 2015 it was represented by Conservative councillor Bill Borrett. Since the 2015 boundary changes it is within the new Upper Wensum ward of Breckland District Council, which is currently represented by two Conservative councillors, Bill Borrett and Gordon Bambridge.

Notable people
 Lilian Leveridge (1879–1953), teacher, writer

References 

Villages in Norfolk
Civil parishes in Norfolk
Breckland District